Zhu Yue (born 4 May 2001) is a Chinese footballer currently playing as a defender for Shanghai Shenhua.

Career statistics

Club
.

References

2001 births
Living people
Chinese footballers
China youth international footballers
Association football defenders
Shanghai Shenhua F.C. players